The 1980 European Karate Championships, the 15th edition, was held  in Barcelona, Catalonia, Spain from May 5 to 7, 1980.

Competition

Team

Women's competition

References

1980
International karate competitions hosted by Spain
European Karate Championships
European championships in 1980
Sports competitions in Barcelona
1980s in Barcelona
Karate competitions in Spain
May 1980 sports events in Europe
1980 in Catalonia